Flemming Oluf Quist Møller (19 May 1942 – 31 January 2022) was a Danish director, cartoonist, children's author, drummer, screenwriter, and actor.

Career
As a director, he started with small experimental animation, often in collaboration with Jannik Hastrup. He made contributions as a children's author, and in a totally different ballgame, he was co-author of Anders Refn films such as Strømer (1976), The Heritage (1978) and Black Harvest (1993).

Central to Quist Møller's sprawling work stands the cartoon Benny's Bathtub (1971) which he wrote the script for and directed together with Jannik Hastrup. It was selected by the Danish Ministry of Culture in 2006 as one of the ten most important Danish films ever. The film about a boy's colorful dream life in a modern apartment building is a musical satire of regimentation and an appeal to the playful imagination – characteristics include Quist Møller's work in many fields. In 1971 he and Hastrup received Danish Film Critics Association's Bodil Honorary Award for Benny's Bathtub.

The charming Jungledyret Hugo (1993), which he both wrote and co-directed, was so successful that there were two sequels: Jungle Animal 2 – the great film hero (1996) and Hugo the Movie Star: Cheeky, flippant and free (2007). The drawing style had become rounder, and his tone more family friendly. Cykelmyggen og Dansemyggen (2007) is based in the same musical legend style upon Quist Møller's own children's books about Cykelmyggen Egon.

Quist Møller was a percussionist in Bazaar with Peter Bastian and Anders Koppel.

In 1994 Quist Møller received a Bodil Honorary Award for his total stake in Danish film.

He died from a heart attack on 31 January 2022 in Copenhagen at the age of 79.

Filmography

Awards 
 1971 Danish Film Critics Association's Bodil Honorary Award for Benny's Bathtub
 1994 Danish Film Critics Association's Bodil Honorary Award for lifetime achievements

References

External links 
 
 
 

1942 births
2022 deaths
Bodil Honorary Award recipients
Danish animated film directors
Danish animators
Danish film directors
Danish male screenwriters
Danish voice directors
People from Lyngby-Taarbæk Municipality